The Baths of Antoninus or Baths of Carthage, located in Carthage, Tunisia, are the largest set of Roman thermae built on the African continent and one of three largest built in the Roman Empire. They are the largest outside mainland Italy. The baths are also the only remaining Thermae of Carthage that dates back to the Roman Empire's era. The baths were built during the reign of Roman Emperor Antoninus Pius.

The baths are at the South-East of the archaeological site, near the presidential Carthage Palace. The archaeological excavations started during the Second World War and concluded by the creation of an archaeological park for the monument. It is also one of the most important landmarks of Tunisia.

The baths are today part of the Archaeological site of Carthage on the list of World Heritage sites of UNESCO. On 17 February 2012, the Tunisian government proposed the Roman hydraulic complex Zaghouan-Carthage, that the baths are part of, as a future World Heritage site.

Location

See also
 List of Roman public baths

References

Ancient Roman baths